Byron King-Noel, 12th Baron Wentworth, styled Viscount Ockham (12 May 1836 – 1 September 1862) was a British peer and the eldest of the three legitimate grandchildren of George Gordon, Lord Byron.

Lord Ockham was the eldest son of William King-Noel, 1st Earl of Lovelace and his wife, Ada Lovelace, the world's first computer programmer. His maternal grandparents were the poet Lord Byron and Annabella Byron, 11th Baroness Wentworth. He gained the rank of officer in the service of the Royal Navy, although he deserted, worked his passage back to Britain and became a shipyard worker - probably working for the Blyth shipping chandlers (Limehouse). As his mother predeceased him, he inherited the barony of Wentworth from his grandmother, but two years later died unmarried and childless at the age of 26, and his barony passed to his brother, Ralph, who was then styled Viscount Ockham and later inherited the earldom.

References

12
British courtesy viscounts
Heirs apparent who never acceded
1836 births
1862 deaths